Machetá is a municipality and town of Colombia in Almeidas Province of the department of Cundinamarca. It borders Tibiritá and Manta in the east, Chocontá and Sesquilé in the west and Guatavita and Gachetá in the south.

Etymology 
In the Chibcha language of the Muisca, Machetá means "Your honourable farmfields".

History 

Machetá in the times before the Spanish conquest was inhabited by the Muisca, organized in their Muisca Confederation. Machetá was ruled by the zaque based in Hunza, currently known as the capital of Boyacá Department Tunja.

Modern Machetá was founded in 1593 by Miguel de Ibarra after a soldier of the army of Gonzalo Jiménez de Quesada first established the town in 1540.

Economy 
Main economical activity of Machetá is agriculture with products as papa criolla, arracacha, peas and tomatoes.

References 

Municipalities of Cundinamarca Department
Populated places established in 1593
1593 establishments in the Spanish Empire
Muisca Confederation
Muysccubun
Climbing areas of Colombia